M70, M-70, or M.70 may refer to:

Transportation
 BMW M70, a 1990s V12 automobile engine
 M-70 (Michigan highway), a former state highway in Michigan
 M-70 (marine highway), a federal marine highway, including parts of the Mississippi River, the Missouri River, and the Ohio River
 M70 motorway (Hungary), a motorway in Hungary
 Macchi M.70, an Italian light biplane of the late 1920s
 M70 (Johannesburg), a road in Johannesburg

Other uses
 Messier 70, a globular cluster in the constellation Sagittarius
 Zastava M70, a Yugoslav version of the AK-47 assault rifle
 M 70, an age group for Masters athletics (athletes aged 35+)
 M70, a Samsung Sens laptop computer model